Monique Deland (born July 6, 1958) is a Quebecer poet. She is a recipient of the Grand Prix de Poésie Le Noroît (1993), Prix Émile-Nelligan (1995), Prix Alain-Grandbois (2009), Prix Félix-Antoine-Savard (2010), and the Grand Prix Quebecor du Festival international de Poésie (2019).

Biography
Monique Deland was born in Montreal and trained as a visual artist. She is the daughter of André Deland, (1926-1979, Geology Professor at Sir George Williams / Concordia University) who taught her the love of science according to her Discours de réception à l'Académie des lettres du Québec  and Suzanne Lapointe (sister of Jean Lapointe, a Quebec actor).

From 1978 to 1995, Deland taught visual arts at the high school level. From 1993 to 2002, she earned a masters and doctorate in literary studies at the Université du Québec à Montréal. She won the Prix Québec-Amérique in 1998 for her master's degree thesis Rivages, Pour une esthétique de l'ambivalence.

From 1999 to 2007, she was a member of the editorial team for the poetry magazine Estuaire. She has also been a poetry critic for the literary magazines Trois,  Estuaire, Moebius and Les Écrits. She is now a regular poetry critic for Estuaire, since 2018. Deland is an elected member of the Académie des lettres du Québec, since 2014.

Awards
She received the Grand Prix de Poésie Le Noroît in 1993 for Ta présence à peine. In 1995, she was awarded the Prix Émile-Nelligan for her first poetry book Géants dans l'île,  and, in 2009, received the Prix Alain-Grandbois for Miniatures, balles perdues et autres désordres. She also was awarded two prizes from the Festival international de la Poésie at Trois-Rivières : in 2010 the Prix Félix-Antoine-Savard, and in 2019 the Grand Prix Quebecor du Festival international de Poésie for her most recent book J'ignore combien j'ai d'enfants.

Selected works 
Géants dans l'île (1994)
L'intuition du rivage (2000)
Le nord est derrière moi (2004)
Miniatures, balles perdues et autres désordres (2008)
Géologie des corps surpeuplés (2011)
 La nuit, tous les dieux sont noirs (2014)
 J'ignore combien j'ai d'enfants (2018)

References 

1958 births
Living people
Canadian poets in FrenchDiscours de réception à l'Académie des lettres du Québec
Université du Québec à Montréal alumni
Writers from Montreal
Canadian women poets
Canadian women journalists
20th-century Canadian poets
20th-century Canadian women writers
21st-century Canadian poets
21st-century Canadian women writers
Canadian literary critics
Women literary critics
Canadian women non-fiction writers
Prix Alain-Grandbois